Radley W. Haddad (born May 11, 1990) is an American professional baseball coach for the Pittsburgh Pirates of Major League Baseball.

Career
Haddad attended Brebeuf Jesuit Preparatory School in Indianapolis. He was recruited to Western Carolina University, where he played college baseball for the Western Carolina Catamounts. After two years as a backup catcher with the Catamounts, Haddad transferred to Butler University to get more playing time. He was a starting catcher for the Butler Bulldogs for two years.

Haddad was not selected in the 2013 Major League Baseball draft, and signed with the New York Yankees as an undrafted free agent. He played in Minor League Baseball for the Yankees for four years. In 2016, he was a player-coach for the Staten Island Yankees. In 92 career games, he batted .203 with one home run.

The New York Yankees hired Haddad as a bullpen catcher in 2017, ending his playing career. After the 2021 season, the Pirates hired Haddad as a game planning and strategy coach.

References

External links

Living people
1990 births
People from Carmel, Indiana
Baseball catchers
Western Carolina Catamounts baseball players
Butler Bulldogs baseball players
Gulf Coast Yankees players
Staten Island Yankees players
Charleston RiverDogs players
Tampa Yankees players
Trenton Thunder players
Major League Baseball bullpen catchers
Pittsburgh Pirates coaches